Vollis Simpson (1919 – May 31, 2013) was an American "outsider" folk artist known for large kinetic sculptures called "whirligigs", which Simpson made from salvaged metal. He lived and worked in Lucama, North Carolina.  Many of his larger pieces are on display at the Vollis Simpson Whirligig Park in Wilson, North Carolina, about 10 miles from Lucama.

Life before art 
Vollis Simpson was born in 1919 to Oscar and Emma Simpson of Spring Hill Township in Wilson County, North Carolina. According to his wife, Jean Simpson, he was 8th of 12 children. He left school after the 11th grade.

Because he was not attracted to being a farmer, Simpson worked at servicing the farm's equipment, the threshers, bailers, tractors, and pumps which are used in farming.

Simpson served in the US Army Air Corps during World War II in the Pacific Theatre. He demonstrated his intuitive engineering skills while stationed on Saipan in the Northern Marianas Islands, where he constructed a windmill out of parts from a junk B-29 Superfortress bomber to power a washing machine for his company.

After the war, Simpson founded a house-moving operation with his brothers to supplement the income from the family farm. He designed and built much of the heavy equipment they used to move houses, creating a first of its kind crop sprayer. He also ran a machine shop for decades.

The 1940 United States Census shows Simpson living at home with his parents, two sisters – Hazell, four years older, Eldnir, five years younger – and a younger brother, Darvell. His occupation is listed as "farming".

Art career 

Simpson retired at the age of 60, and began to build wind-driven structures which he called "windmills", but came to be called whirligigs. He built a number of large whirligigs on his property in Lucama surrounding a pond across from his workshop. This was referred to by locals as "Acid Park" because of how the sculptures would reflect car headlights when people came out after dark.

Simpson was commissioned to create a whirligig for the American Visionary Art Museum in Baltimore. He was also commissioned to create whirligigs for the 1996 Summer Olympics in Atlanta. Four of his works were installed at the Olympic's Folk Art Park and remained there on permanent display.

Other of Simpson's whirligigs have been exhibited at the American Folk Art Museum in New York City and at the Abby Aldrich Rockefeller Folk Art Museum in Williamsburg, Virginia.  Some of his sculptures have sold for thousands of dollars.

Recognition 
In 2004 Wilson, North Carolina held its first annual Wilson Whirligig Festival. The festival was renamed in 2016 to the North Carolina Whirligig Festival, and is usually held the first full weekend of November. The Vollis Simpson Whirligig Park was created in Wilson to document, conserve, and display the large sculptures from Simpson's land in Lucama. The park had its grand opening on November 2, 2017.  Simpson acted as a consultant for the renovation of the whirligigs for display.

The North Carolina legislature recognized Simpson's contributions and in June 2013 designated Simpson's Whirligigs as the official folk art of North Carolina.

Death 
Simpson died at his home in Lucama at the age of 94.

Quotes 
"[I’ve been a] farmhouse mover, electric welder, carpenter, the list goes on. If you don't try something, you don't learn anything. Common sense. You come across a lot of these people that know so damn much, sometimes you find out they're dumber than I am..."

References 
Notes

External links 

 American Visionary Art Museum - Our Visionaries
 Science Museum of Minnesota article on Simpson
 PBS Independent Lens 'Off The Map' article on Simpson
 Indy Week (Raleigh area) article on Simpson on his death
 Vollis Simpson Whirligig Park

1919 births
2013 deaths
Artists from North Carolina
People from Wilson County, North Carolina
Folk artists
United States Army Air Forces personnel of World War II